The 2010 FIA WTCC Race of Germany was the eighth round of the 2010 World Touring Car Championship season and the sixth running of the FIA WTCC Race of Germany. It was held at the Motorsport Arena Oschersleben near Oschersleben, Germany on 5 September 2010. Race one was won by Alain Menu of Chevrolet RML and race two was by Andy Priaulx of BMW Team RBM.

Background
After the Race of the Czech Republic, Yvan Muller was leading the drivers' championship by a reduced margin of five points of Gabriele Tarquini. Sergio Hernández was leading the Yokohama Independents' Trophy.

Harry Vaulkhard was forced to miss the event and the rest of the season having run out of finances. His replacement was Japanese racer Yukinori Taniguchi, who had previously driven for N. Technology in the 2008 World Touring Car Championship season.

Report

Free practice
Tarquini set the pace in the opening free practice session, leading Chevrolet driver Robert Huff. Jordi Gené was third and Andy Priaulx was the fastest BMW in fourth. The session was red flagged twice, firstly when Stefano D'Aste stuck his Scuderia Proteam Motorsport BMW 320si into a tyre wall. The red flags were out for the second time at the end of the session when Tiago Monteiro went off at the Hasseroder Curve as rain started to fall, bringing first practice to an early close.

Muller led a Chevrolet 1–2 in the second practice session on a drying track. Menu was second and Monteiro was the fastest SEAT driver. Michel Nykjær survived an off to go sixth fastest as the best Rookie Challenge driver.

Qualifying
Augusto Farfus took his second pole position of the season in qualifying, beating Chevrolet's Huff by a tenth of a second. All of the SR-Sport, RML Chevrolet and BMW Team RBM cars made it through to Q2, as well as the Zengő-Dension Team car of Norbert Michelisz. Monteiro damaged his front right wheel at the end of Q1 and was unable to take part in Q2, he therefore lined up tenth.

With rain starting to fall, the remaining cars went out to set a time straight away. Huff, Tarquini and Gené required a second lap to set a competitive time. By the third lap, the rain was heavier and caught out Huff who spun and collided with team mate Menu. Tarquini lost control and hit a wall while Michelisz cut across the grass. The rain induced incidents brought out the red flags with three minutes remaining. The session was not restarted, so Priaulx put his BMW in third in the manufacturer's home race and Menu was fourth. Michelisz was fifth and Tarquini was sixth while Tom Coronel, Muller and Gené completed the top nine ahead of Monteiro.

Warm-Up
Chevrolet finished 1–2–3 in the foggy conditions of Sunday morning's warm–up session with Huff leading Menu and Muller. Priaulx stopped out on track while D'Aste damaged the rear of his BMW in a separate incident.

Race One
Farfus started from pole position but ran wide at turn one after clashing with Huff who had been tapped by Menu. Farfus dropped down to fourth as Huff took the lead followed by Menu and Coronel. Tarquini was caught up the first corner contact and was forced to retire with damage to his SEAT León 2.0 TDI. Further back, Fredy Barth collided with Jordi Gené while Andrei Romanov and Taniguchi did likewise. Huff was later given a drive–through penalty for his part in the clash with Farfus, he failed to serve his penalty within the required three laps and was black–flagged. Farfus had passed Coronel and was closing in on new race leader Menu but couldn't catch him before the finish, finishing second with Muller finishing third. Coronel was fourth, Monteiro was fifth and Priaulx was sixth having started third. Michelisz finished eight to claim pole position for race two and Kristian Poulsen was independent winner.

Race Two
Starting from third on the grid, Priaulx passed pole sitter Michelisz to take the lead of the race at the first corner. Monteiro bumped off both Nykjær and Michelisz and later served a drive–through penalty. Monteiro's penalty promoted Farfus into second and Muller into third. Towards the end of the race, Menu and Michelisz had been running seventh and eighth but were being caught by Huff, Tarquini and Gené. Huff tapped Michelisz wide at turn one and the Zengő driver dropped to eleventh and out of the points behind the advancing trio. Huff went on to catch Menu at the end of the race as the BMW Team RBM pair finished 1–2 on home turf with Muller the final podium finished and Poulsen repeated his Independents' Trophy victory from race one.

Results

Qualifying

Race 1

Bold denotes Fastest lap.

 — Coronel, Gené, Michelisz, Franz Engstler, Romanov, Nykjær, Barth, Mehdi Bennani, Poulsen, Hernández, D'Aste and Taniguchi all received 30–second post race penalties for breaking the speed limit during the rolling start.

Race 2

Bold denotes Fastest lap.

 — Romanov was given a 30–second penalty after the race a 10–place suspended grid penalty for the next two events for causing a collision.
 — Monteiro was given a 30–second post–race penalty in addition to the driver–through penalty he served on lap six for a collision.

Standings after the event

Drivers' Championship standings

Yokohama Independents' Trophy standings

Manufacturers' Championship standings

 Note: Only the top five positions are included for both sets of drivers' standings.

References

Results Booklet PDF at MST Systems

External links
World Touring Car Championship official website

Germany
FIA WTCC Race of Germany